Allandale may refer to:

Places

Australia
 Allendale, Victoria (also known as Allandale), a town in Victoria, Australia
 Electoral district of Allandale
 Allandale, New South Wales, a locality in the Hunter Valley

Canada
 Allandale (Toronto), an historic house in Toronto, Canada
 Allandale, a former village in Innisfil (1891) settled in 1850s then annexed to Barrie, Ontario in 1896 and now a neighbourhood within Barrie

New Zealand
 Allandale, New Zealand, a settlement near Governors Bay, Banks Peninsula, Christchurch City
 Allandale, Mackenzie, a settlement near Fairlie, Mackenzie District

United Kingdom
 Allandale, Falkirk, a village in Falkirk, Scotland, United Kingdom

United States
 Allandale, Austin, Texas, a neighbourhood in Austin, Texas, USA
 Allandale, Florida, a community in Volusia County, Florida, USA

US Virgin Islands
 Allandale, United States Virgin Islands, a settlement on the island of Saint Croix, United States Virgin Islands

See also
 Alan Dale (disambiguation)
 Allendale (disambiguation)
Allandale station (disambiguation)